Mark E. Rogers (April 19, 1952 – February 2, 2014) was an American author and illustrator.

Biography

Rogers, while a student at Pt. Pleasant Beach High School, wrote a short novel, The Runestone, which has since been adapted into Willard Carroll's 1990 film starring Peter Riegert and Joan Severance, although it remains unpublished.... except as a numbered, signed limited edition chapbook published by Burning Bush Press in 1979.  At the University of Delaware he continued his interest in writing, graduating summa cum laude with a Bachelor of Arts degree in 1974. He was elected to membership in Phi Beta Kappa.

He thereafter became a professional writer. His published works include the Samurai Cat series; a number of novels, The Dead, Zorachus, and the latter's sequel, The Nightmare of God; a series of books known as Blood of the Lamb; and another series called Zancharthus. He has also published three art portfolios and a collection of his pin-up paintings, Nothing But A Smile.

Death

Rogers often had heart problems, he died from apparent heart failure while hiking with his family in California's Death Valley.

Bibliography

Samurai Cat
 (1980)  The Bridge of Catzad-Dum - chapbook, published by The Burning Bush Press, ltd. ed. of 500
 (1984) The Adventures of Samurai Cat (1986) More Adventures of Samurai Cat (1989) Samurai Cat in the Real World (1991) The Sword of Samurai Cat (1994) Samurai Cat Goes to the Movies (1998) Samurai Cat Goes to HellZorachus
 (1986) Zorachus (1988) The Nightmare of GodBlood of the Lamb
 (1991) The Expected One (1991) The Devouring Void (1992) The Riddled ManZancharthus
 (1998) Blood and Pearls (2000) Jagutai and Lilitu (2002) Night of the Long KnivesNovels
 (1989) The Dead (2010) Lilitu (2010) YarkNonfiction
 (2003) Nothing But a Smile: The Pinup Art of Mark Rogers (2005) The Art of Fantasy''

References

External links

1952 births
2014 deaths
20th-century American novelists
21st-century American novelists
American fantasy writers
American male novelists
American science fiction writers
University of Delaware alumni
Writers from Delaware
Chapbook writers
20th-century American male writers
21st-century American male writers